The Journal of Immunotoxicology is a quarterly peer-reviewed scientific journal that publishes articles in the fields of immunotoxicology, immunology, and toxicology. It is published by Informa.

Aims and scope 
The journal publishes findings about the immunomodulating effects, as well as mechanisms of activity, of:
 industrial chemicals
 pharmaceuticals
 environmental contaminants
 food products
 radiation
 stressors

Editor in chief and impact factor
The editor in chief of the Journal of Immunotoxicology is Mitchell D. Cohen (New York University School of Medicine, Tuxedo, New York, United States.

According to the Journal Citation Reports it received an impact factor of 2.054, ranking it 55th out of 87 journals in the category "Toxicology".

References

External links 
 

Publications established in 2004
Toxicology journals
Immunology journals
Quarterly journals
Taylor & Francis academic journals